The servant songs (also called the servant poems or the Songs of the Suffering Servant) are four songs in the Book of Isaiah in the Hebrew Bible, which include Isaiah 42:1–4; Isaiah 49; ; and –. The songs are four poems written about a certain "servant of YHWH" (‘eḇeḏ Yahweh). Yahweh calls the servant to lead the nations, but the servant is horribly abused by them. In the end, he is rewarded.

Some scholars regard Isaiah 61 as a fifth servant song, although the word "servant" (‘eḇeḏ) is not mentioned in the passage. This fifth song is largely disregarded by modern scholars; without it, all four fall within Deutero-Isaiah, the middle part of the book, the work of an anonymous 6th-century BCE author writing during the Babylonian Exile. The five songs were first identified by Bernhard Duhm in his 1892 commentary on Isaiah.

Jewish interpretation

The Self-Glorification Hymn from Dead Sea Scrolls asserts, from the first-person narrative, a messianic human who has been exalted into heaven with a status above the angels. This figure rhetorically asks "Who bears all griefs as I do? And who suffers evil like me? Who has been despised on my account?" to imply that he has been despised unlike anyone before, modelling himself on the suffering servant from Isaiah's servant songs.

Rabbinic Judaism sees this passage, especially "God's Suffering Servant" as a reference to the Jewish nation, not to the king Mashiach. Jewish teaching also takes note of the historical context in which God's Suffering Servant appears, particularly because it speaks in the past tense. The Jewish nation has borne unspeakable injustices, under Assyria, Babylonia, Ancient Greece, ancient Rome, which are all gone, and bears persecution to this day.

Hebrew Bible
Jewish scripture in Isaiah speaks in the light, when it says:
 "But thou, Israel, My servant..."
 "Ye are My witnesses, saith the LORD, and My servant whom I have chosen..."
 "By oppression and judgment he was taken away, and with his generation who did reason? for he was cut off out of the land of the living, for the transgression of my people to whom the stroke was due..."
 "Of the travail of his soul he shall see to the full, even My servant..."

See also Ramban in his disputation.

Talmud
 "The Messiah --what is his name?...The Rabbis say, The Leper Scholar, as it is said, `surely he has borne our griefs and carried our sorrows: yet we did esteem him a leper, smitten of God and afflicted...'"–Babylonian Talmud: (Sanhedrin 98b)
 "Another explanation (of Ruth ii.14): -- He is speaking of king Messiah; `Come hither,' draw near to the throne; `and eat of the bread,' that is, the bread of the kingdom; `and dip thy morsel in the vinegar,' this refers to his chastisements, as it is said, `But he was wounded for our transgressions, bruised for our iniquities'".–Midrash Ruth Rabbah

Modern Judaism
". "The theme of Isaiah is jubilation, a song of celebration at the imminent end of the Babylonian Captivity".

Christian interpretation
Christians traditionally see the servant as Jesus Christ. The songs are quoted to and applied to Jesus multiple times in the New Testament, as described in following sections. Another Christian interpretation combines aspects of the traditional Christian and the Jewish interpretation. This position sees the servant as an example of 'corporate personality', where an individual can represent a group, and vice versa. Thus, in this case, the servant corresponds to Israel, yet at the same time corresponds to an individual (that is, the Messiah) who represents Israel.

The first song

The first poem has God speaking of his selection of the servant who will bring justice to earth. Here the servant is described as God's agent of justice, a king who brings justice in both royal and prophetic roles, yet justice is established neither by proclamation nor by force. He does not ecstatically announce salvation in the marketplace as prophets were bound to do, but instead moves quietly and confidently to establish right religion (Isaiah 42:1-4).

The first four verses are quoted in Matthew's gospel, where it is said that the prophecy is fulfilled in Jesus' withdrawal from the cities of Galilee and his request that the crowds do not make him known.

The second song

The second poem, written from the servant's point of view, is an account of his prenatal calling by God to lead both Israel and the nations. The servant is now portrayed as the prophet of the Lord equipped and called to restore the nation to God. Yet, anticipating the fourth song, he is without success. Taken with the picture of the servant in the first song, his success will come not by political or military action, but by becoming a light to the gentiles. Ultimately his victory is in God's hands. Isaiah 49:1-6.  is quoted by Simeon in  concerning the infant Jesus Christ during the time of His mother Mary's purification.

The third song

The third poem has a darker yet more confident tone than the others. Although the song gives a first-person description of how the servant was beaten and abused, here the servant is described both as teacher and learner who follows the path God places him on without pulling back. Echoing the first song's "a bruised reed he will not break," he sustains the weary with a word. His vindication is left in God's hands. Isaiah 50:4-9  is seen by New Testament commentators to be a Messianic prophecy of Jesus Christ. 50:6 is quoted in Handel's "Messiah" of Jesus. There is an allusion in Luke 9:51 to Isaiah 50:7 ("Therefore I have set my face like a flint"), as Jesus "set His face steadfastly" to go to Jerusalem.

The fourth song

The fourth of the servant songs begins at Isaiah 52:13, continuing through 53:12 where it continues the discussion of the suffering servant.

There is no clear identification for the servant within this song, but if the reader pays close attention to the author's word choice, one can deduce that the song could refer to either an individual or a group. According to theologian Michael Coogan, those who argue the servant to be an individual have "proposed many candidates from Israel's past". The song declares that the "servant" intercedes for others, bearing their punishments and afflictions. In the end, he/they are rewarded.

It can be argued that the servant represents a group of people, more specifically the nation of Israel, and they feel that they have paid their dues and continue to suffer because of the sins of others (Isaiah 53:7,11-12). Also, through the author's choice of words, we, our, and they, one could also argue that the "servant" was a group.

Early in the passage, the evaluation of the servant by the "we" is negative: "we" esteemed him not, many were appalled by him, nothing in him was attractive to "us". But at the servant's death the attitude of the "we" changes after , where the servant suffers because of "our" iniquities, "our" sickness, but by the servant's wounds "we" consequently are healed. Posthumously, then, the Servant is vindicated by God.

Many Christians believe this song to be among the messianic prophecies of Jesus. Methodist founder John Wesley suggested that it is "so evident" that "it is Christ who is here spoken of". Jesus quoted one sentence in Isaiah 53:12 of this 4th servant song as referring to himself in Luke 22:37, and the New Testament cites it as referring to Jesus Christ in Matthew 8:17, Mark 15:28, John 12:38, Acts 8:32–33, Romans 10:16, 15:21 and 1 Peter 2:22.

References

External links
 The Servant Songs of Isaiah
 Servant Songs of Isaiah 
 A Comparison of Ancient and Medieval Jewish Interpretations of the Suffering Servant in Isaiah

Book of Isaiah